Arthur Harrison (September 1878 – after 1902) was an English professional footballer who played in the Football League for Small Heath.

Harrison was born in the Stirchley district of Birmingham. He went to school in Cotteridge and played football for Linton before joining Small Heath of the Second Division in 1902. He made his debut on 20 December 1902, scoring twice in a 3–1 win at home to Lincoln City, but had the thankless task of trying to dislodge England international Charlie Athersmith from the outside-right position – Harrison's debut was the first game Athersmith had missed since September 1901 – and he played only three more games that season before returning to local football with Brownhills Athletic.

References

1878 births
Year of death missing
Footballers from Birmingham, West Midlands
English footballers
Association football forwards
Birmingham City F.C. players
English Football League players
Place of death missing